James Alfred "Shag" Thompson was a Major League Baseball outfielder. He played parts of three seasons in the majors, from  until .He played mostly for the Philadelphia Athletics. An avid ball player he was, he also enjoyed the managerial aspect of the game. Later in life, he went on to be the General Manager and co-owner of The Somerset Patriots, a minor league ball club based in Somerset, New Jersey.

Thompson was expected to be a mainstay of the 1916 Philadelphia Athletics, but he was released after starting the season with no hits in 17 at-bats.  Prior to his death in 1990, Thompson was the last living player to have played on the pitiful 1916 A's--a team often regarded as the worst MLB club of the 20th century. 

He excelled in his coaching career and eventually started two youth baseball leagues in nearby Flemington, New Jersey. He then became involved in suburban development by purchasing large plots of farm land and constructing neighborhoods. Hedgerow Estates, Stanton Ridge, and Cushetunk are three of his many suburban developments he helped found.

External links

Major League Baseball outfielders
Philadelphia Athletics players
Durham Bulls players
Richmond Climbers players
Omaha Rourkes players
Bloomington Bloomers players
Columbus Senators players
Moline Plowboys players
Evansville Evas players
Evansville Little Evas players
Greensboro Patriots players
Baseball players from North Carolina
1893 births
1990 deaths
People from Alamance County, North Carolina